Ribao is a village in the commune of Mayo-Darlé in the Adamawa Region of Cameroon, near the .

Population 
In 1967, Ribao contained 1184 inhabitants, mostly Mambila.

At the time of the 2005 census, there were 2073 people in the village.

References

Bibliography 
 Jean Boutrais, 1993, Peuples et cultures de l'Adamaoua (Cameroun) : actes du colloque de Ngaoundéré du 14 au 16 janvier 1992, Paris : Éd. de l'ORSTOM u.a.
 Dictionnaire des villages de l'Adamaoua, ONAREST, Yaoundé, October 1974, 133 p.

External links 

 Mayo-Darlé, on the website Communes et villes unies du Cameroun (CVUC)

Populated places in Adamawa Region